"Catch You" is a song by the British recording artist Sophie Ellis-Bextor for her third album, Trip the Light Fantastic (2007). It was written by Cathy Dennis, Rhys Barker and Greg Kurstin and produced by Kurstin. It was released as the album's first single on 19 February 2007. "Catch You" is a pop rock song and talks about Bextor chasing the guy that she wants.

It received mostly positive reviews from music critics, who commended the infusion of rock guitars and electronic beats, while calling it a strident and very good song. A music video was directed by Sophie Muller and it shows Sophie chasing a guy in Venice. The song performed moderately on the charts, reaching number 8 on the UK Singles Chart, peaking inside the top twenty on the Italian and Russian Singles Chart and inside the top fifty on the other countries.

Background and composition
The single was first announced on New Year's Eve 2006, where Ellis-Bextor performed the song on the BBC's "New Year Live" show. "Catch You" was written by Cathy Dennis and co-written by Greg Kurstin and Rhys Barker and produced by Greg Kurstin. It is a pop rock song and combines guitars, zingy keyboards, nu wave angular guitars with a nagging pop melody. The lyrics concern Sophie possibly bugging various parts of her bloke's flat (mailbox, "easy chair", flatscreen), in the hope that she will "catch him".

Critical reception
K. Ross Hoffman of Allmusic commented, "She sounds dramatically reinvigorated here, with a notable infusion of rock guitars and often a forceful, even menacing, electro edge to the productions, evident right out the gate in this strident, barnstorming first single." Nick Levine of Digital Spy called it "a turbo-charged stalker-pop." Emily MacKay of Yahoo! Music called it "a merciless first strike, a crisp, laser-cut, feather-light puff of dance-floor ephemera sprinkled with disco 'pow!'s, its '70s synth-Chinoiserie chorus given an icy aloofness by Sophie's plummy delivery." Stuart Waterman of Popjustice commented: "It is both a very good song and an excellent advertisement for romantic lunacy. It sounds not unlike what would happen if the Sugababes kidnapped Avril Lavigne and bullied her into playing guitar on one of their more 'upbeat' numbers."

Talia Kraines of BBC Music wrote that the song "gave us a grittier Sophie." Stuart McCaighy of This Is Fake DIY gave the song a mixed review, commenting "It was perhaps a touch one-dimensional, too 'of the moment' for a lead single; its chorus dragged rather than ignited." However, Kitty Empire of The Observer expressed: "It's a rubberised stab of bunny-boiler club-pop, which deserved to chart higher than number 8."

Chart performance
When the song was released, its immediate competition included Kelis's single "Lil Star", The Fray's "How to Save a Life", Take That's "Shine", Justin Timberlake's "What Goes Around... Comes Around" and Mika's "Grace Kelly". "Catch You" peaked at No. 8 on the UK Singles Chart. The single also peaked at No. 33 on the ARIA Singles Chart and at No. 7 on the ARIA Dance Chart. The song also reached the B-list of Radio 1's official playlist and the A-list of BBC Radio 2's official playlist. The song stayed in the UK Top 40 for two months and went to sell 148,000 copies.

Music video
The music video was subsequently filmed in Venice by Sophie Muller, and was released on 13 January 2007. The video has been compared to the movie Don't Look Now.

Track listings
 2-track single
 "Catch You" – 3:17
 "Down with Love" – 3:55

 Maxi-single
 "Catch You" – 3:17
 "Down with Love" – 3:55
 "Catch You" (Moto Blanco Radio Edit) – 3:31
 "Catch You" (Riff & Rays Radio Edit) – 3:35
 "Catch You" (Music Video) – 3:27

 12_inch vinyl
 "Catch You" (Moto Blanco Club Mix) – 8:29
 "Catch You" (Moto Blanco Dub) – 6:49
 "Catch You" (Digital Dog Mix) – 6:37
 "Catch You" (Riff & Rays Mix) – 8:19

 12-inch picture disc
 "Catch You" – 3:17
 "Catch You" (Jay Cox's Fizzekal Half Dub Remix) – 6:08
 "Catch You" (Moto Blanco Radio Edit) – 3:31
 "Catch You" (Digital Dog Mix) – 6:37

Credits and personnel
Credits are adapted from the liner notes of Trip the Light Fantastic.

Studio
 Recorded at Echo Studios (East Road, London)

Personnel
 Written by Cathy Dennis, Rhys Barker and Greg Kurstin
 Vocal production by Cathy Dennis
 Engineered by Dario Dendi, assisted by Zoe Smith at Eden Studios
 Assistant vocal recording engineer: Eddie Miller at Echo Studios
 Programming and instruments by Greg Kurstin
 Additional programming by Brio Taliaferro
 Additional guitar: Tim Van Der Kuil
 All music produced and played by Greg Kurstin

Charts

Weekly charts

Year-end charts

References

2007 singles
2007 songs
Fascination Records singles
Music videos directed by Sophie Muller
Song recordings produced by Greg Kurstin
Songs written by Cathy Dennis
Songs written by Greg Kurstin
Sophie Ellis-Bextor songs